The Polish 200 Złotych note is a denomination of Polish currency. It is also the only Polish bill to feature a hologram (only in first, non-modernized version). The bill's dimensions are 144 x 72 mm.

The obverse of the note features a likeness of King Sigismund I the Old. The reverse depicts the white eagle wrapped in the letter S, inscribed in a hexagon, from the Sigismund's Chapel at the Wawel Castle.

External links

NBP
Official description of the 200 złotych note (In English)

Currencies introduced in 1995
Banknotes of Poland
Two-hundred-base-unit banknotes